College Park Historic District may refer to:

 College Park Historic District (Lake Worth, Florida), listed on the NRHP in Florida
College Park Historic District (College Park, Georgia), National Register of Historic Places listings in Fulton County, Georgia
College Park Historic District (Tacoma, Washington), National Register of Historic Places, Washington State Heritage Register